Anthony G. Griggs (born February 12, 1960) is a former American football linebacker in the National Football League. He was drafted by the Philadelphia Eagles in the fourth round of the 1982 NFL Draft.

Griggs was born in Lawton, Oklahoma. He grew up in Willingboro Township, New Jersey where he played high school football at John F. Kennedy High School.

He played college football at Ohio State and Villanova.  He also played for the Cleveland Browns.

References

1960 births
Living people
People from Willingboro Township, New Jersey
Sportspeople from Lawton, Oklahoma
Players of American football from Oklahoma
American football linebackers
Ohio State Buckeyes football players
Villanova Wildcats football players
Philadelphia Eagles players
Cleveland Browns players